Powercor Australia is an Australian electricity distribution company that operates throughout western Victoria, and the western suburbs of Melbourne.

The company owns and maintains power lines, substations and street lights and also manages the largest electricity distribution network in Victoria.

Powercor is 51% owned by the Cheung Kong Holdings and 49% by Spark Infrastructure which also own Citipower, which maintains the city of Melbourne's CBD network, and SA Power Networks, which maintains the South Australian network.

Network statistics
As of September 2011:

 Total line length: 84,026 km
 Area covered: 150,000 km2
 Customers: 730,273
 Zone substations 70
 Zone substation transformers (66 kV to 22 kV): 137
 Distribution Ttransformers (22 kV to 240 V): 81,553
 Poles: 535,941
 31,865 customers supplied via single-wire earth return rural grid
 Wires underground: 10.6%
 86% classified as 'rural'
 Network availability: 99.96%

References

Electric power distribution network operators in Australia